Bevare Gud vår Kung (Swedish for "God Save Our King") was the first royal anthem of Sweden. Written in 1805 by Abraham Niclas Edelcrantz  (1754–1821) to honor King Gustaf IV Adolf, it was set to the melody of the British anthem "God Save the King".  The song would serve as the de facto royal anthem from 1805 to 1893, when Kungssången was adopted as the official royal anthem.

Lyrics

See also
Kungssången

References

National symbols of Sweden
Royal anthems
Swedish monarchy
European anthems
1805 songs
God Save the King